Independența is a commune in Călărași County, Muntenia, Romania. It is composed of three villages: Independența, Potcoava and Vișinii.

As of 2007 the population of Independenţa is 3,552.

References

Communes in Călărași County
Localities in Muntenia